Asit Baran (19 November 1913 – 27 November 1984) was an Indian actor, singer and theater personality.

Early life
Asit Baran was born as Asit Baran Mukherjee in 1913 in Kolkata, British India. His nickname was Kalo. He took up a job in the telegraph workshop at Alipore. He learnt Tabla from Jnan Prakash Ghosh and joined in Akashbani Kolkata as Tabla player. While performing Tabla in All India Radio Music Conference, actor Pahari Sanyal impressed on him. Asit Baran often called upon to sing at various music functions in Kolkata.

Career
He first acted in the film Pratishruti in 1941. Within the next few years he performed as actor-cum-singer in several super-hit films in Bengali and Hindi and became a promising star of the New Theatres. After that, Asit Baran worked continuously for more than four decades on the silver screen, starred in number of Bengali as well as Hindi films. He also started the theatre group Rangarash. Asit Baran died on 27 November 1984.

Selected filmography
 Pratishruti
 Kashinath
 Nurse
 Joradighir Chowdhury Paribar
 Surya Sakhi
 Parineeta
 Pratyabartan
 Hrad (film)
 Parchhain
 Bhagini Nivedita
 Drishtidan
 Bondhu
 Mantra Shakti
 Khokababur Pratyabartan
 Sudhar Prem
 Smriti Tuku Thak
 Alor Pipasa
 Ashite Ashiona
 Antony Firingee
 Teen Batti Char Raasta
 Sri Sri Ramkrishna Kothamrita
 Jadi Jantem
 Bagh Bondi Khela
 Khana Baraha
 Kalankini Kankabati
 Ma Bhabani Ma Amar
 Prithivi Amarey Chai

References

External links
 

1913 births
1984 deaths
Bengali male actors
20th-century Indian male actors
Male actors in Hindi cinema
People from Kolkata
Male actors from West Bengal
Male actors in Bengali cinema
Bengali theatre personalities
Indian male stage actors